The Homegrown Player Rule is a Major League Soccer program that allows MLS teams to sign local players from their own development academies directly to MLS first team rosters. Before the creation of the rule in 2008, every player entering Major League Soccer would have to be assigned through one of the existing MLS player allocation processes, such as the MLS SuperDraft.

MLS roster rules allow a team to sign players to contracts similar to Generation adidas contracts, which do not count against the MLS salary budget and may earn a much higher salary than the league minimum. MLS has since removed this wording from the roster rules. That means homegrown players will not count against the salary budget only if they are registered using supplemental roster slots, but will still count against the salary budget if they are registered using senior roster slots. There is, however, supplementary salary budget made by MLS only for homegrown players that are registered using senior roster slots called homegrown player funds.

To place a player on its homegrown player list, making him eligible to sign as a homegrown player, players must have resided in that club's home territory and participated in the club's youth development system for at least one year, as well as meeting other unspecified league requirements.

If a player on a team's homegrown list goes to college or U17, U20, and U23 United States men's national soccer teams, he remains eligible to sign as a homegrown player at any time as long as he is registered with the club as a homegrown player first. Since the program's inception, some players have elected to skip years in college to play in MLS academies and sign with senior clubs.

In 2014, Seattle's DeAndre Yedlin became the first MLS Homegrown player to compete in a World Cup.

Homegrown players history
Notes

 This list only includes players who were fully eligible to be a Homegrown Player and officially signed a Homegrown Player contract with MLS. This is not a list of academy players for each respective MLS team. 
 Players with their names in Bold have received a full international cap.
 Former MLS sides Miami Fusion and Tampa Bay Mutiny were dissolved before the introduction of the Homegrown Player Rule.
 The following list of players have been reported as or claimed to be Homegrown Players, but never officially signed a Homegrown Player contract identifying them as such for MLS roster rule purposes; Julián Araujo, Freddie Braun, Eduardo Cortes, Kyle Duncan, Raheem Edwards, Steven Emory, Jake LaCava, Chris Lema, Nico Lemoine, Pierre da Silva, and Zack Steffen.
 Nizar Khalfan was classified as a Homegrown Player, despite never been part of the Vancouver Whitecaps academy.

Atlanta United

Austin FC

Charlotte FC

Chicago Fire

Chivas USA (defunct)

FC Cincinnati

Colorado Rapids

Columbus Crew

FC Dallas

D.C. United

Houston Dynamo

Inter Miami

Sporting Kansas City

LA Galaxy

Los Angeles FC

Minnesota United

CF Montréal

Nashville SC

New England Revolution

New York City FC

New York Red Bulls

Orlando City

Philadelphia Union

Portland Timbers

Real Salt Lake

San Jose Earthquakes

Seattle Sounders

St. Louis City SC

Toronto FC

Vancouver Whitecaps

Notes

Records
The following table shows the leading home grown player goal scorer by season. It also shows which club the player was with in that season, as well as the player's age at the end of that season.

References

Major League Soccer rules and regulations